Paraleptomys is a genus of rodent from New Guinea.  It is considered part of the New Guinea Old Endemics, meaning it was part of the first wave of murine rodents to colonize the island. Members of the genus are similar to those in Leptomys but differ in that they do not have elongated hind feet or a third molar. Little is known of the two species' biology.

Species
Genus Paraleptomys
Northern water rat (Paraleptomys rufilatus) - Found in the Cyclops mountains of north-central New Guinea
Short-haired water rat (Paraleptomys wilhelmina) - found in western and central New Guinea

References

 
Rodent genera
Taxa named by George Henry Hamilton Tate